Florencio Castelló (1905 – 23 August 1986) was a Spanish actor, known for participating in the Golden Age of Mexican cinema, acting alongside personalities of Mexican cinema such as Pedro Infante and Cantinflas. He usually played roles of Spaniard with an Andalusian accent.

He left Spain in 1936 fleeing the civil war in his country, joining a theater company in which he performed Andalusian works, which toured throughout Latin America until in 1939 he arrived in Mexico.

He also served as a voice actor, being known for voicing Mr. Jinks in the Latin American Spanish dub (done in Mexico) of the Hanna-Barbera cartoon series Pixie and Dixie and Mr. Jinks, also using his Andalusian accent.

Selected filmography
 Neither Blood nor Sand (1941)
 Dos mexicanos en Sevilla (1942)
 Simón Bolívar (1942)
 El verdugo de Sevilla (1942)
 ¡Así se quiere en Jalisco! (1942)
 Santa (1943)
 Escándalo de estrellas (1944)
 Gangsters Versus Cowboys (1948)
 Tía Candela (1948)
 Lost (1950)
 Azahares para tu boda (1950)
 También de dolor se canta (1950)
 Port of Temptation (1951)
 Canasta uruguaya (1951)
 Las locuras de Tin-Tan (1952)
 Here Comes Martin Corona (1952)
 El Enamorado (1952)
 Sombrero (1953)
 You Had To Be a Gypsy (1953)
 Camelia (1954)
 Tú y las nubes (1955)
 Barefoot Sultan (1956)
 A sablazo limpio (1958)
 Dos corazones y un cielo (1959)
 The Miracle Roses (1960)
 The Black Bull (1960)
 Adventures of Joselito and Tom Thumb (1960)
 Vacations in Acapulco (1961)
 The White Horse (1962)
 The Exterminating Angel (1962)
 El padrecito (1964)
 La casa de las muchachas (1969)
 The Holy Office (1974)
 The Bricklayer (1975)

References

External links

1905 births
1986 deaths
Spanish male film actors
Spanish male television actors
Spanish male voice actors
People from Seville
Spanish refugees
Spanish emigrants to Mexico
Refugees in Mexico